West Aisle Ridge in Antarctica is a named from the position of the ridge in a group of three ridges in relation to The Stage.

Ridges of Victoria Land
Scott Coast